The Clube Desportivo O Maculusso, formerly Club Desportivo Têxtil de Luanda, is an Angolan multisports club based in Luanda. Desportivo do Maculusso was named after its major sponsor, a textile factory in Luanda called Macambira. As the textile factory went out of business in 1999, the club was renamed after the neighborhood in which it was located, the neighborhood of Maculusso in Luanda. The club's women's basketball team competes at the local level, at the Luanda Provincial Basketball Championship and at the Angola Women's Basketball League.

Honours

Roster

Manager history
 Alexandre Neto 2004

Players

See also
Angola Women's League
Federação Angolana de Basquetebol

References

External links
 
AfricaBasket profile
Facebook profile

Sports clubs in Angola
Basketball teams in Angola